The following is a list of all team-to-team transactions that have occurred in the National Hockey League during the 2009–10 NHL season. It lists what team each player has been traded to, signed by, or claimed by, and for which player(s) or draft pick(s), if applicable.

Retirement

Free agency
Note: This does not include players who have re-signed with their previous team as an Unrestricted Free Agent or as a Restricted Free Agent.

Trades between teams

June

July

August

September

October

November

December

January

February

March

May

June

See also
2009–10 NHL season
2009 NHL Entry Draft
2010 NHL Entry Draft
2009 in sports
2010 in sports
2008–09 NHL transactions
2010–11 NHL transactions

References
TSN transactions
TSN 2009 Free Agent Tracker
The Hockey News Forecaster
nhl.com Free Agent signings

Transactions
National Hockey League transactions